John Crea (born September 27, 1951) is a former American football coach and scout. He was the first head football coach for Methodist University Monarchs football team in Fayetteville, North Carolina. In three seasons, he compiled an overall record of 2–28, including two 0–10 seasons to start the new program. Crea was also the head coach at William Paterson University prior to Methodist and amassed a record of 31–38–1 from 1982 to 1988.

Head coaching record

References

1951 births
Living people
Miami Dolphins scouts
Methodist Monarchs football coaches
New York Giants scouts
William Paterson Pioneers football coaches